Burdette is both a surname and a given name. Notable people with the name include:

Surname
 Blake Burdette (born 1980), American rugby union player and coach
 Clara Burdette (1855—1954), American clubwoman and philanthropist
 Erin Burdette (born 1983), American former tennis player
 Floyd Burdette (1914–1995), American college basketball player and head coach
 Freddie Burdette (1936–2010), American Major League Baseball pitcher
 Hattie Elizabeth Burdette (1872–1955), American painter
 Keith Burdette, American politician
 Kevin Burdette, American operatic bass
 Lew Burdette (1926–2007), American Major League Baseball pitcher
 Mallory Burdette (born 1981), American tennis player
 Matthew Burdette (born 1992), American rapper, singer, songwriter, and record producer better known as Blxst
 Nicole Burdette, American playwright and actress
 Robert Jones Burdette (1844–1914), American humorist

Given name
 Burdette Haldorson (born 1934), American basketball player
 Burdette Johnson (1885–1947), American numismatist
 Burdette Keeland (1926–2000), American architect and professor
 Burdette Solum (1927–2012), American politician

English-language masculine given names